Athens Traffic Live is a live album by Eric Burdon And The Animals, recorded in 2005 in Greece. It includes a bonus DVD.

Track listing
 "Introduction" – 0:16
 "Boom Boom" (John Lee Hooker) – 5:57
 "When I Was Young" (Eric Burdon) – 4:31
 "Factory Girl" (Eric Burdon, Trad.) – 4:42
 "Once Upon a Time" (Eric Burdon) – 4:00
 "Devil Slide" (Eric Burdon) – 4:38
 "Heaven" (David Byrne) – 4:49
 "The Night" (Eric Burdon, Don Evans,) – 3:56
 "In My Secret Life" (Leonard Cohen) – 6:02
 "Over the Border" (David Munyon) – 4:35
 "Little Queenie" (Chuck Berry) – 4:24
 "Tobacco Road" (Eric Burdon, John D. Loudermilk) – 11:56
 "Mercy's Hand" (Tom Hoeflich) – 5:08

Personnel 

 Eric Burdon - screamed and growled vocals, percussion
 Dean Restum - guitar, background vocals
 Martin Gerschwitz - keyboards, violin
 Dave Meros - bass
 Bernie Pershey - drums

Eric Burdon albums
SPV/Steamhammer albums
2005 live albums
2005 video albums
SPV/Steamhammer video albums